Sara Margareta Mattsson (born 13 May 1979) is a Swedish former football defender who played for KIF Örebro DFF of the Damallsvenskan league. She won 112 caps as a member of the Sweden women's national football team.

Career
She formerly played for Malmö FF Dam. In November 2008, her Woman's Professional Soccer playing rights were obtained by St. Louis who named her as a post-draft discovery player. She played fifteen games for the team in its inaugural season, then returned to Linköpings for the WPS off-season, during which she was drafted by the Philadelphia Independence in WPS's first expansion draft.

After the 2010 season Larsson returned to Sweden, with KIF Örebro DFF. She signed for Elitettan club LB07 ahead of the 2014 season, but retired in April 2014 due to pregnancy.

International
Larsson earned over 100 caps for the Sweden women's national football team. She won the rookie of the year (Sweden) in 2000, after making her national team debut in September 2000 in a 2–1 win over rivals Norway.

Matches and goals scored at World Cup & Olympic tournaments
Sara Larsson featured for Sweden in two World Cups: USA 2003 and Germany 2011. She was also on the roster for the 2007 World Cup, but did not appear in any of Sweden's matches. Larsson played in three Olympic Games: Sydney 2000, Athens 2004, and Beijing 2008.

Matches and goals scored at European Championship tournaments
Sara Larsson appeared at three European Championship tournaments: Germany 2001, England 2005, and Finland 2009.

Personal life
Larsson married Jens Mattsson on 15 August 2015, with whom she already had a son. She subsequently took his surname.

References

Match reports

External links
 
 Sweden player profile
 Linköpings FC player profile 
 Atlanta Beat player profile

Swedish women's footballers
1979 births
Living people
People from Kristinehamn
People from Kristinehamn Municipality
Olympic footballers of Sweden
Footballers at the 2008 Summer Olympics
Saint Louis Athletica players
Atlanta Beat (WPS) players
Sweden women's international footballers
FIFA Century Club
2011 FIFA Women's World Cup players
Damallsvenskan players
KIF Örebro DFF players
FC Rosengård players
Linköpings FC players
Women's association football defenders
Women's association football midfielders
2007 FIFA Women's World Cup players
2003 FIFA Women's World Cup players
Women's Professional Soccer players
Sportspeople from Värmland County